Crowley High School is a high school in Crowley, Texas, and a part of the Crowley Independent School District.

Notable alumni
 Lance Barrett, MLB Umpire
 Bryan Bertino, film director and writer
 Leon Bridges, Grammy nominated singer
 Markus Jones, Canadian Football League linebacker
 Kara Killmer, Actress
 Joey McGuire, head football coach, Texas Tech University
 Gary Reasons, former NFL linebacker
 Drew Smith, MLB pitcher for the New York Mets
 Milton Williams, NFL player
 Diane Zamora, murderer

References

External links
 Crowley High School

Crowley Independent School District high schools